Rhynchostele londesboroughiana is a species of plant in the orchid family, Orchidaceae. It is endemic to the State of Guerrero in Mexico.

References 

 Berg Pana, H. 2005. Handbuch der Orchideen-Namen. Dictionary of Orchid Names. Dizionario dei nomi delle orchidee. Ulmer, Stuttgart

External links 
 

Oncidiinae
Flora of Guerrero
Orchids of Mexico
Plants described in 1876